Chüy (- Chuyskoye) is a village in the Kemin District of Chüy Region of Kyrgyzstan. Its population was 60 in 2021.

References

Populated places in Chüy Region